Platige Image S.A. is a Polish company founded in 1997. It specialises in computer graphics, 3D animation, and digital special effects. Its core business includes advertising as well as film, art, and academic projects.

The studio employs a staff of over 300 artists, including directors, art directors, graphic designers, and producers. Platige has received over 250 awards and honours, including four Best of Show awards at the SIGGRAPH festival and a British Academy of Film and Television Arts (BAFTA) award. The studio was nominated for an Academy Award, the Palme d'Or at the Cannes Film Festival, and the Golden Lion at the Venice International Film Festival.

Product divisions

Commercials 
Platige has created over 2,500 commercials and has worked with the largest advertising agencies in Poland and abroad, including BBDO, DDB Worldwide, Grey Global Group, Havas Worldwide, JWT, Leo Burnett Worldwide, Saatchi & Saatchi, PZL, Publicis, and Young and Rubicam.

Since its foundation, the studio has worked on advertising projects intended for international markets. Commercials created by Platige have appeared in Great Britain, Russia, Portugal, and the United States, advertising a wide variety of brands, including LEGO, Kellogg Company, Discovery Channel, History Channel, and Vodafone.

Platige was behind many popular Polish commercials, including the “Orange World” series, the ads for Tesco and the Biedronka discount supermarket chain, the ads featuring the Heart and Mind characters, as well as the ads for the Żubr beer brand.

Animation 
Platige Image won international recognition and acclaim for its animated shorts, including The Cathedral (2003), Fallen Art (2004), Ark (2007), The Kinematograph (2009), Paths of Hate (2010), and the cinematics The Witcher and its sequel. The Platige team was also involved in multiple unique projects, including  City of Ruins, the first ever stereoscopic reconstruction of a razed city, and the stereoscopic interpretation of Jan Matejko's painting, Battle of Grunwald. In 2011, Platige created the “Move Your Imagination” campaign that promoted Poland at ITB Berlin, the largest international tourism trade fair.

Film 
The studio was involved in VFX work for multiple Polish and international feature films, including Lars von Trier's Melancholia (2011) and Antichrist (2009), Jerzy Skolimowski's Essential Killing (2010), Andrzej Wajda's Katyń (2007), and Rafał Wieczyński's Popiełuszko. Wolność jest w nas. Currently, Platige is working on special effects for Łukasz Barczyk's Hiszpanka.

A subsidiary company, called Platige Films, was created to extend the feature film and TV production capacities of Platige Image. The first feature produced by the subsidiary is called Another Day of Life. The film, released in 2018, is based on Ryszard Kapuściński's book under the same name.

History 

Platige Image was founded by Jarosław Sawko and Piotr Sikora in Warsaw, in 1997. The two met in an MBA degree program and their trust in the development potential of the animation and post-production market led them establish their own company. They raised start-up capital by selling 300 studio lamps of their own design. The company debuted with VFX work for the music video for Justyna Steczkowska's Niekochani (1997), which went on to win the Machiner award. The turning point for the studio came with their redesign of the visuals for TVP1, Poland state-owned television channel. Platige received the Golden Eagle award in 1999 for the redesign which paved its way into the world of advertising work.
 
Since its inception, Platige has been collaborating with the largest Polish and international advertising agencies, including BBDO, DDB, Gray, Havas Worldwide, JWT, Leo Burnett, Saatchi & Saatchi, PZL, Publicis, and Young and Rubicam. The steady increase of advertising jobs and commissions allowed Platige to expand its staff and operations.
 
The VFX work for Quo Vadis (2001) directed by Jerzy Kawalerowicz was Platige's first big film challenge. A special piece of software was created solely for the purpose of automatic cloning of characters that were to populate the Roman Colosseum depicted in the movie.
 
Simultaneously, Platige was involved in purely artistic pursuits. Tomek Bagiński's The Cathedral, the first animated short produced by Platige was released in 2002. It was nominated for an Academy Award in the Best Animated Short Film category a year later. The success of The Cathedral opened up the way for more original in-house productions and Platige released its next short, Marcin Waśko's Undo, in that same year.

In 2004, Platige moved into its new headquarters at Racławicka 99 in Fort Mokotów, one of the forts comprising Fortress Warsaw, a ring of fortifications constructed in the 19th century.

Two years after The Cathedral, Tomek Bagiński released Fallen Art. The short received the Jury Award at the SIGGRAPH festival and the British Academy of Film and Television Arts (BAFTA) award in the Best Short Animation category.

Ça Ira, an opera by Roger Waters, had its world premiere in Poznań in 2006. Platige was commissioned by the opera's director, Janusz Józefowicz, to create the visuals for the performance. The resulting two-hour-long animation, composed of archival footage and animated sequences, was used as digital set design for the performance, accompanying the actors on stage.

In 2007, Platige released Ark, a short film directed by Grzegorz Jonkajtys. The movie was shot using MILO Motion control, a system that combined realistic set designs with computer animation. Ark was screened at multiple international movie festivals and received numerous awards and honors, including the Best of Show Award at the SIGGRAPH festival, and a Golden Palm nomination at the Cannes Film Festival.

Another landmark event of 2007 that opened up new development avenues for Platige was the collaboration with CD Projekt Red, a video game development and publishing house. As a result of that collaboration, Tomek Bagiński directed Platige's first video game cinematic for “The Witcher.” The cutscene was nominated for a Visual Effects Society award.

Also in 2007, Platige was once again involved in a theater production. The studio, in cooperation with the Warsaw-based Roma Theater, created digital stage designs for The Academy of Mr. Kleks.

Platige was subsequently commissioned to create digital set designs for “Seven Gates of Jerusalem,” a performance prepared for Krzysztof Penderecki's 75th birthday.  The animation was directed by Tomek Bagiński. The show was nominated for an Emmy Award.

In 2009, two major historical motion pictures were released, both containing VFX work by Platige Image: Rafał Wieczyński's Popiełuszko: Wolność jest w nas and Andrzej Wajda's Katyń. The latter was the first Polish movie with digital post-production done in 4K resolution technology – that is in nearly thirty times the resolution of typical television productions. Platige processed over 160 shots, totaling over 15 minutes of the entire movie.

Also in 2009, the Danish production house  Zentropa commissioned Platige Image to do visual effects for Lars von Trier's Antichrist. The project resulted in a subsequent collaboration on the director's next movie, Melancholia, which was later nominated for the Golden Palm at the 2011 Cannes Film Festival.

Tomek Bagiński's follow-up effort, The Kinematograph, was also released in 2009. The movie was the result of Bagiński's collaboration with Jakub Jabłoński, an illustrator who designed the visuals and served as the film's animation director. Inspired by Victorian fairy tales, Jabłoński used Mateusz Skutnik's comic, “Revolutions 3. Monochrome,” as basis for his concept art for the movie.

In that same year, Platige produced its first commercial short that utilized stereoscopy, LECH Run. The experienced enabled the studio to get involved in 3D filmmaking and similar projects.

In 2010, the studio completed three important special projects that exhibited use of animation in service of both: art and education.

Platige was commissioned by the Polish Agency for Enterprise Development to create animated movies that would promote Poland at the Expo 2010 in Shanghai. One was called The Animated History of Poland and was directed by Tomek Bagiński, while the other, directed by Rafał Wojtunik, was called The Animated Guide to Polish Success.

For the Warsaw Uprising Museum, the studio created City of Ruins – the first ever digital stereoscopic reconstruction of a razed city. The film recreates the flight of a B-24 Liberator bomber over the ruins of Warsaw that took place in the spring of 1945.

The National Museum in Warsaw commissioned the studio to create the first ever stereoscopic interpretation of Jan Matejko's “Battle of Grunwald (painting)” for the battle's 600th anniversary.

Commissioned by the National Culture Centre, Tomek Bagiński directed a series of ads called The Battle of the Sexcentenary for the campaign promoting the events commemorating the 600th anniversary of the Battle of Grunwald. Meanwhile, another director with a very clear and recognizable style, Damian Nenow, emerged from the Platige staff. His second short (after The Great Escape), the first he created at Platige, called Paths of Hate, received multiple awards at numerous international festivals, including the Best of Show award at SIGGRAPH, a Special Distinction at the Annecy IAFF and was nominated for a Visual Effects Society award.

In 2011, Platige faced a whole new challenge: preparing a complex image campaign for the Polish Tourism Organization that would promote Poland at ITB Berlin, the largest tourism trade fair in the world. The campaign slogan: Move Your Imagination. The studio undertook a successful attempt to radically overhaul Poland's image abroad using modern design and the possibilities offered by computer animation. The campaign featured a series of animated movies, the use of massive sculptures of the campaign characters in various public spots in Berlin and outdoor advertising, as well as an interactive stereoscopic show for the 5,000 people that participated in the opening ceremony of the trade fair.

The end of 2011 brought three more important events.

On December 14, 2011, Platige became a publicly traded company by entering the NewConnect stock market. On the day of its stock exchange debut, the price of Platige shares soared by 32.1%, leveling out at 21 PLN. A year later, the price of Platige shares (identified by the PLI symbol) has risen by another 76%.

A design of the permanent exhibition at the Museum of Polish History, developed jointly by Platige and the WWAA architecture design studio, has been selected as the winner of an international contest organized by the Museum authorities. Also in 2011, the studio established a working relationship with the Qatari government to produce “Dream 2030,” an animated short directed by Grzegorz Jonkajtys and Rafał Wojtunik. It was Platige's first production for the new market.

The year 2012 opened up new avenues for development. The company started a subsidiaries based in New York City – Platige Image, LLC and Platige Image, US, and in São Paulo, Platige established relations with Jarbas Agnelli, an acclaimed director from Brazil, and his agency, AD Studio.

Also in 2012, the studio produced the opening cinematic for The Witcher 2: Assassins of Kings. The animation received numerous awards and honors, including the prestigious Gold Award at the London International Awards.

On December 18, 2012, on Qatar National Day, the studio released its biggest movie production yet. The film, called Hero and Message and produced for the Qatari government, is a 25-minute-long animation composed of over 500 shots that took 6 months to complete.

In January 2013, the studio released another cinematic, Cyberpunk 2077, a new title developed by CD Projekt Red.

Capital Group 
The Platige Image Capital Group consists of:

 1. mniam.tv Sp. z o.o., based in Warsaw.
Platige Image S.A. owns 62% of the company. mniam.tv specializes in cinematography for advertising and animation.

 2. Juice Sp. z o.o., based in Wrocław.
Platige Image S.A. owns 51% of the company. Juice is a computer graphic design studio that also deals with 3D graphics.
 
 3. Platige US, Inc., based in New York City.
Platige Image S.A. currently owns 100% of the company. Platige US, Inc. represents the interests of Platige Image S.A. in the United States. 
 
 4. Platige Image, LLC, based in New York City.
A subsidiary of Platige US, Inc. created to establish cooperation with Alanda, Ltd., a subsidiary of Fluid. Platige US, Inc. currently owns 70% of the company.
 
 5. Platige Films Sp. z o.o., based in Warsaw.
Platige Image S.A. currently owns 100% of the company. Platige Films is involved in producing original movie projects and copyright management.

Key projects

Commercials

Short animated films

Other animated productions

Film VFX

Stage productions

Cultural heritage productions

Cinematics

Awards

References

External links 
 Platige Image
 Shorts of Platige Image with their descriptions and biographies of directors 
 Platige Image profile on Behance, where the company presented background information about their productions

Visual effects companies
Cinematography organizations
Polish animation studios
Film production companies of Poland
Mass media companies established in 1997
1997 establishments in Poland
Companies based in Warsaw
Companies listed on the Warsaw Stock Exchange